Rodrick Del Rodgers (born June 22, 1960) is a former professional American football player who was selected by the Green Bay Packers in the 3rd round of the 1982 NFL Draft. A 6'1" running back-kickoff returner from the University of Utah, Rodgers was the first 1,000 yard rusher in Utah history. Rodgers was hired by KCRA 3 in 1997.

Pro football career

From 1982 to 1985, Rodgers played for the Packers. On December 9, 1984, he made a 97-yard kick return for a touchdown against the Chicago Bears, which remains a Soldier Field Record by an opponent that still stands today. After a one-year absence from the league because of an injury, he made a come back and played two years  with the San Francisco 49ers from 1987–1988, earning a Super Bowl championship for the 1988 season.

Sports broadcasting

Del Rodgers is the Sports Director at KCRA 3 in Sacramento, CA.
He joined the KCRA 3 Sports department in 1997. Del, who is  well loved and respected was promoted to sports director after three years, he currently anchors the sportscasts Monday through Friday.KCRA News Team Bio

References

External links
 KCRA Bio
 Football stats

1960 births
Living people
American football running backs
Utah Utes football players
Green Bay Packers players
San Francisco 49ers players
Television anchors from Sacramento, California
Players of American football from Washington (state)
National Football League replacement players